AC/DShe (pronounced A C - D She) is an all-female AC/DC tribute band. The band, hailing from San Francisco, covers only pre-1980s AC/DC songs (thus those written while Bon Scott was still alive). The band was created by Nicki Williams and Amy Ward in 1997. AC/DShe has toured throughout the US and in Europe and performed at the AC/DC tribute festival in Wales in 2004. They began getting significant media coverage in November 2001, with a feature in Details Magazine and have had national and international press since, alongside other gender-specific tribute acts such as Lez Zeppelin and Mandonna. They were also featured in an article on Hustler magazine that covered all-female tribute bands.

Members
Current members
Amy Ward (Bonny Scott) - lead vocals
Pamela Ausejo (Agnes Young) - lead guitar
Sara Brownell (Mallory Young) - rhythm guitar, background vocals
Nicki Williams (Riff Williams) - bass, background vocals
Tina Gordon (Philomena Rudd) - drums

Former members
Tina Lucchesi (Phyllis Rudd) - drums
Erin McDermott (Mallory Young) - rhythm guitar, background vocals
Alison Victor (Agnes Young) - lead guitar
Natalie Smith (Mallory Young) - rhythm guitar, background vocals
Clementine Ross (Phyllis Rudd) - drums
Gretchen Menn (Agnes Young) - lead guitar

References

External links
AC/DShe Official website
Official Facebook

All-female tribute bands
Musical quintets
AC/DC
Musical groups established in 1997